Pella in Palaestina is an ancient and titular diocese of the Roman Catholic Church also called the Diocese of Khirbet El-wahadneh, and it is centered on Pella, Jordan.

History

Zebennus of Pella

It was a titular see by the time Michel Le Quien wrote.

Bishops

Known ancient bishops
 Zebenus

Titular Catholic bishops 
 Hieronim Maciej Jełowicki  (21 Feb 1725 Appointed – 8 Jan 1732 ) 
 Stefan Olshavskyi (20 May 1735 Appointed – 24 Dec 1737 ) 
 Bartolomeo Antonio Passi (28 Sep 1744 Appointed – 23 Jul 1774) 
 Johann Nepomuk August Ungelter von Deisenhausen (12 Jul 1779 Appointed – 26 Feb 1804 ) 
 Johann Nepomuk von Dankesreither (24 Aug 1807 Appointed – 23 Sep 1816) 
 Ignaz Bernhard Mauermann (14 May 1819 Appointed – 14 Sep 1841) 
 Charles Michael Baggs (9 Jan 1844 Appointed – 16 Oct 1845) 
 Jean-Pierre Dalmond (28 Jan 1848 Appointed – ) 
 Alexandre-Hippolyte-Xavier Monnet (3 Oct 1848 Appointed – 1 Dec 1849) 
 Gustavo Leonardo de Battice (28 Dec 1877 Appointed – 13 Aug 1889) 
 François-Nicolas-Alphonse Kunemann (27 Feb 1901 Appointed – 20 Mar 1908 ) 
 Thomas Kurialachery (30 Aug 1911 Appointed – 21 Dec 1923 Appointed, Bishop of Changanacherry (Syro-Malabarese)) 
 William Francis Brown (29 Jan 1924 Appointed – 16 Dec 1951) 
 Pedro Grau y Arola (24 Mar 1953 Appointed – 4 Mar 2002)

See also
 Catholic Church in Jordan

References

Catholic titular sees in Asia